Dead End: Paranormal Park is an animated fantasy horror comedy streaming television series created by Hamish Steele for Netflix, which is based on the graphic novels series DeadEndia by Steele and Cartoon Hangover's Too Cool! Cartoons web short Dead End. Produced by Blink Industries, the series premiered on June 16, 2022. A second and final season premiered on October 13, 2022. On January 13, 2023, Steele announced that the series had been canceled.

Premise
The series follows Barney and Norma, the newest employees at their local theme park, Phoenix Parks, a Dollywood-esque park created by the famous celebrity Pauline Phoenix. Joined by Pugsley, Barney's childhood dog, and Courtney, a thousand-year-old demon, they discover the world of the Paranormal as well as learning new things about themselves.

Plot

Barney Guttman, voiced by Zach Barack, is the main protagonist of the series. He is a gay transgender teen boy who finds a new job as a security guard of Phoenix Parks. Barney has family problems. His grandmother doesn’t accept the fact that he is trans. While it hasn't been made clear what his grandmother said to him, it was shown to be very hurtful. Barney’s parents accept him for who he is, but do nothing when his grandmother begins verbally abusing him. Shortly after starting at his new job, Barney secretly moves in the Haunted House attraction with his dog, Pugsley. On the same day, Norma Khan is also starting her new job at Phoenix Parks as part of the security team. Norma is a 17-year-old autistic Pakistani-American girl who is obsessed with all things Pauline Phoenix. Norma is very socially anxious, dreading social interaction and has been shown to have panic attacks when overwhelmed. 

After walking to the haunted house and entering, they meet Courtney, a demon who disguises herself as part of the attraction. Courtney is taking orders from Temeluchus, a member of the demon royal family. Temeluchus needs a vessel to interact with the world and tasks Courtney to bring them Barney. After Barney's dog Pugsley realizes this, he jumps in front of Barney and ends up getting possessed instead of Barney. He flies to an attraction in Camelot Creek to claim a throne.

Barney's scared that Pugsley might get hurt, so he walks to the attraction. Norma follows him after doubting a bit. Norma gets an idea from an old Pauline Phoenix film where a demon soul is captured by taking a photograph. When they both arrive at Camelot Creek, Norma turns on the attraction and Barney hops in a boat for Temeluchus/Pugsley follow, Tempting the demon with his body as a vessel instead of his dogs. The plan works along fine, but then Temeluchus realizes the duo's plan turns the camera away from him using magic. Norma then succeeds in turning the camera back. They then capture the soul and head back to the haunted house.

When they get to the haunted house, Barney and Norma give the photograph to Courtney, who is sad because Temeluchas promised to return her to her home, but happy not to be taking anymore orders. Courtney realizes that part of Temeluchas is missing from the photo. Pugsley still has a bit of Temeluchus inside him, because of this he has gained the ability to talk, use magic and easily walk on two legs. 

There are more secrets and mysteries at Phoenix Parks, Will our new friends survive what they are in store for?

Characters and voice cast

 Zach Barack as Barney Guttman, an 17-year-old gay transgender boy. 
 Kody Kavitha as Norma Khan, a 17-year-old bisexual and autistic Pakistani-American  girl who works with Barney. 
 Alex Brightman as Pugsley, Barney's pug. As a result of being possessed by a demon king called Temeluchus, he can speak and possesses magical abilities. He dies in the season 2 finale after he saves his owner and his friends.
 Brightman also plays Temeluchus and The Watcher.
 Emily Osment as Courtney, a thousand-year-old demon. She has been banished from her home and hopes to find a way to return. 
 Clinton Leupp as Pauline Phoenix, a famous actress who is the former owner of Phoenix Parks. 
 Kenny Tran as Logan "Logs" Nguyen, a health and safety officer at the park. He is a gay Vietnamese-American who develops feelings for Barney.
 Kathreen Khavari as Badyah "Deathslide" Hassan, Norma's gentle and friendly best friend. She is Iranian-American and Muslim.
 Michaela Jaé Rodriguez as Zagan, a vampiric demon, and Temeluchus' sister and fellow demon king
 Karen Maruyama as Barborah Winslow, one of Pauline Phoenix's former hosts and current owner of Phoenix Parks.
 Patrick Stump as Josh, a security guard at the park.
 Tucker Chandler as Patrick Guttman, Barney's younger brother.
 Kaitlyn Robrock as Roxanne Guttman, Barney's mother.
 Natasha Chandel as Swati Khan, Norma's mother.
 Cee Nelson as Vince, one of Patrick's friends.
 Angelica Ross and Samantha Jayne as Margie and Marly, an old Lesbian couple.
 Bill Farmer as Chester Phoenix, one of Pauline Phoenix's ex-husbands.
 Z Infante as Jules, a non-binary ghost.
 Kemah Bob as Henrietta, an orb ghost.
 Jamie Demetriou as Fingers, a serpentine angel resembling a giant arm sent from the fourth plane to watch over Pugsley. 
 Taylor Gibson as Asmodeus, a demon wrestler.
 Haley Joel Osment as Danny, a fallen angel worker.
 Piotr Michael as Pael, the Head Angel of the fourth plane.

Production, development, and release
On 17 August 2020, Steele explained how the show changed from its original iteration on Cartoon Hangover in 2014, and the graphic novels that followed it, stating that he is grateful for showrunners who fought for LGBTQ characters in their shows, adding that there was "absolutely no pushback from Netflix about representation", while describing Barney as a trans male character. He also hoped that the show will help out "more trans creators getting their chance to tell their stories" while hinting at other LGBTQ characters in the show apart from Barney. In another interview, he was thankful to Netflix executives for letting them have diversity in the show while pushing for it, and pushing him to "tell the story I want to tell". He stated that all the scripts were reviewed by GLAAD and said he couldn't wait for people to know Barney. Jen Rudin was a casting executive for the show.
Julian Guidetti is the show's composer, and features original songs written by Patrick Stump. In January 2023, he revealed that the series was pitched to Netflix in 2019, and that the series wasn't a "word-for-word adaptation" of the comics he had written.

The series was scheduled to premiere in 2021. The series was originally scheduled for a Fall 2021 premiere on Netflix. 

In August 2021, Steele noted the importance of trans representation in the series, hoped it took a stance against transphobia in the UK, and noted there are "multiple trans cast and crew". On 23 October 2021, Netflix reserved a trademark with the new name for the series: "Dead End: Paranormal Park".

On 19 May 2022, the show's trailer premiered and confirmed the show would premiere on 16 June 2022. Mey Rude of Out stated that the trailer gives a "great look at the show" and said that the show features queer and trans characters, addressing these identities "through important storylines". 
The first season premiered June 16, 2022. 

In July 2022, after the show's release, Steele argued that the series was a young adult animation like Infinity Train and hoped for the expansion of the genre in the future. On 6 September 2022, a second season was confirmed to be released on October 13. The second season premiered on October 13. On 13 January 2023, Steele announced that Netflix has cancelled the series.

On 17 January 2023, Steele wrote a guest column in Gizmodo, saying that the cancellation meant that "the story cannot conclude on screen" and added that "politics of TV production" means that creators are "never guaranteed to end things on your terms", differentiating it from writing webcomics and graphic novels.

Episodes

Season 1 (2022)

Season 2 (2022)

Reception
The series was received positively. David Opie of Digital Spy argued that the series satiates the "endless need for adorable queer animation" and noting other animated series with queer-inclusive stories. Abbey White of The Hollywood Reporter said the series isn't "typical" for animated series, noted the "racially-, gender- and sexuality-diverse cast" and argued the series smashes genres and is "equal parts comedy, horror and coming of age." Ben Mitchell, the editor-in-chief of Skwigly called the series a "horror comedy...for younger audiences" and praised the well-developed characters and "incredible attention to detail" in production design. Reuben Baron of Paste called the series "groundbreaking" and argued that U.S. senators Roger Marshall, Mike Lee, Mike Braun, Steve Daines, and Kevin Cramer demanded new content warnings because the series centers on a trans protagonist. Baron criticized the series for not capturing the "visual charm" of the DeadEndia comic and saying the series "tones down" some themes from the comic while praising the writing and treatment of autism in the series.

Jade King of The Gamer argued that the series is "delightfully queer" and said it comes together in a "warm, comforting, and spooky animated adventure". She also praised the show's character development and said the show shouldn't be overlooked. Charles Pulliam-Moore of The Verge called the series a "shining example" of what queer creators can do "when given the resources and freedom to tell their own stories", said its existence is evident in the impact of "other recent progressively minded cartoons" on modern animation and hoped that Netflix renewed the series. Kristy Puchko of Mashable called it a "kinetic and heartwarming adventure cartoon" which delivers on LGBTQ representation and is true to the source material. Barry Levitt of The Daily Beast called the series a "incredibly fun journey" with bright and inviting "colors and charming character designs filling every frame" and said it is a "miracle" the series is coming out, with rising transphobic rhetoric.

References

External links
 
 Dead End: Paranormal Park on IMDb
 Production website

2022 American television series debuts
2022 American television series endings
2020s American animated television series
2020s American horror comedy television series
2020s American LGBT-related comedy television series
2020s American supernatural television series
2020s American workplace comedy television series
2022 British television series debuts
2022 British television series endings
2020s British animated television series
2020s British horror television series
2020s British LGBT-related comedy television series
2020s British workplace comedy television series
American children's animated comedy television series
American children's animated fantasy television series
American children's animated horror television series
Amusement parks in fiction
Animated series based on comics
Animated television series about dogs
Animated television series about ghosts
Anime-influenced Western animated television series
Autism in television
British children's animated comedy television series
British children's animated fantasy television series
British children's animated horror television series
British horror comedy television series
Dark fantasy television series
Demons in television
English-language Netflix original programming
Netflix children's programming
Teen animated television series
Television series by Netflix Animation
Television shows based on comics
Television shows based on webcomics
Transgender-related television shows
LGBT-related animated series
Gay-related television shows
Bisexuality-related television series
Television series about demons
Television series about vacationing
2020s American LGBT-related animated television series